

Cheap Thrills may refer to:

Music

Albums
 Cheap Thrills (Big Brother and the Holding Company album), 1968
 Cheap Thrills (Confederate Railroad album), 2007
 Cheap Thrills (Frank Zappa album), 1998

Songs
 "Cheap Thrills" (song), a 2016 song by Sia
 "Cheap Thrills", a 1968 song by Frank Zappa from Cruising with Ruben & the Jets
 "Cheap Thrills", a 1983 song by David Allan Coe
 "Cheap Thrills", a 1983 song by Planet Patrol

Other uses
 Cheap Thrills (film), a 2013 black comedy thriller
 Cheap Thrills, a 1972 book on popular fiction by Ron Goulart
The Cheap Thrills, an English band